West Midland Safari and Leisure Park is a safari park located in Bewdley in Worcestershire, England. It was opened under the name of West Midland Safari Park in Spring 1973.

The park holds over 165 species of exotic animals and features other attractions such as a small theme park. The park contains the largest groups of white lions, cheetahs, hippopotamuses and meerkats in the UK, as well as the largest lemur walk-through exhibit. It was also the first park in the UK to have the African big five game animals.

The park is a member of the British and Irish Association of Zoos and Aquariums (BIAZA) and the European Association of Zoos and Aquaria (EAZA). The Dhole and Cheetah enclosures in the drive-through safari are part of a larger heathland Site of Special Scientific Interest (SSSI), which the park is restoring.

History
The park was opened by founder Jimmy Chipperfield on 17 April 1973 and hosted a few former circus animals. The park also had a dolphin area where the sea lion theatre is today, but it was a travelling show and the dolphins were later returned to Margate. The 1970s also saw the park develop a "boat safari", although it was later removed. A narrow-gauge railway through parts of the park was constructed by Severn Lamb in 1979.

In 2004, the park featured its first new animal attraction in some time with the arrival of four African white lions in the Kingdom of the White Lions exhibit. The park was the first safari park in the UK to have all five African big game animals, although its leopards have since been moved to Scotland and the last remaining Cape buffalo left in 2022. It was also the first park or zoo in Europe to successfully breed white lion cubs and has made efforts to conserve the species.

In 2006, the managing directors of West Midland Safari Park officially opened the Ongava Research Centre on the Ongava Game Reserve near the Etosha National Park, their "sister park" in Namibia. The centre focuses on researching lions and rhinoceroses and carrying capacity of the reserves, which hold many rare animals. The centre has three full-time researchers who work closely with Save the Rhino and the University of Cape Town.

Sections

African Plain 
The African Plain is home to the southern white rhino, common eland, ellipsen waterbuck, African forest buffalo, red lechwe, Burchell's zebra, Grevy's zebra, giraffe and Ankole cattle.

The Grasslands 
The Grasslands section is home to Persian fallow deer and Barbary sheep.

In the early hours of February 9, 2020, during Storm Ciara, several African wild dogs escaped from their paddock and killed six of the fallow deer and 10 of the Barbary sheep.

Wild Woods 
Wild Woods is home to a group of dholes.

Wild Asia and Realm of the Indian Rhino 
Wild Asia is home to banteng, blackbuck, Formosan sika deer, Philippine spotted deer and barasingha. The Realm of the Indian rhino is home to four Indian rhinoceroses.

On 8 September 2020, an Indian rhinoceros calf was born, a first for the park.

White Tiger Ridge 
White Tiger Ridge was removed during a change in road layout in 2019. All tigers are now located in the Tiger Reserve located in the Eurasian Reserve.

Cheetah Plains 
Cheetah Plains is the UK's largest drive-by Cheetah reserve.

African Wild Dog Reserve 
The African Wild Dog Reserve is home to a group of African wild dogs.

Realm of the Lions 
Realm of the Lions is a fully landscaped reserve and off-road track featuring a pride of African lions.

Kingdom of the White Lions 
Kingdom of the White Lions is home to a pride of rare white lions.

Eurasian Reserve and Tiger Reserve 
Eurasian Reserve is home to Javan banteng, nilgai and Père David's deer. The Tiger Reserve is home to Bengal tigers and endangered Sumatran tigers.

Elephant Valley 
Elephant Valley is home to the safari's African elephants.

In 2021, construction of a new elephant reserve was completed. Currently the park holds two elephants: Sutton and his mother Five.

The Borderlands 
Formerly the elephants' enclosure, Borderlands is home to a herd of Bactrian camels.

Conservation
West Midland Safari Park is known for its efforts in conservation. The park contains many animals that are on the IUCN's Endangered or Critically Endangered list.

In May 2014, the park's Elephant Valley became home to the first male African elephant successfully born as the result of artificial insemination in the UK.

Amusement-park rides

Former rides

Land of the Living Dinosaurs
This is the UK's largest animatronic dinosaur attraction, opened in 2015.

Ice Age 
This is the UK's largest animatronic creator attraction to feature ice-age animals. It opened in 2018.

Discovery Trail

Discovery Trail consists of mostly indoor exhibits and includes animal encounters. Visitors can come near small exotic creatures while under the observation of staff members. Encounter animals include ferrets, lesser hedgehog tenrecs and long-tailed chinchillas.

Penguin Cove
Penguin Cove is home to Humboldt penguins. Their enclosure includes a pool with a semi-submerged beach, sculptures, penguin house and public viewing areas.

Lorikeet Landing
This new heated indoor exhibit is home to a flock of Rainbow lorikeets. A specially designed walkthrough enclosure includes eco-heating to maintain a temperature of 18°C.

Creepy Crawlies
Creepy Crawlies is the park's insect house and contains a small range of animals such as tarantulas, Goliath birdeater spiders, leafcutter ants, locusts, Madagascar hissing cockroaches and scorpions.

Reptile World
The park's reptile house was formerly named after the famous herpetologist Mark O'Shea, who occasionally performed during the reptile-encounter events. Reptiles in this exhibit include the alligator snapping turtle, American alligator, amethystine python, beaded lizard, black rat snake, Borneo short-tailed python, Cuban crocodile, Eastern diamondback rattlesnake, Egyptian cobra, frill-necked lizard, green anaconda, green and black poison dart frog, green tree python, Jamaican boa, king cobra, malagasy giant hognose snake, Nile crocodile, red-eyed crocodile skink, red-eyed treefrog, red-tailed green ratsnake, reticulated python, Saharan horned viper and western diamondback rattlesnake.

Sea Lion Theatre
The Sea Lion Theatre is a 525-seat venue that allows visitors to see the parks’ Californian sea lions performing tricks in a 25-minute show.

SeaQuarium
SeaQuarium is the park's aquarium, containing a wide variety of exotic fish. This is also the park's chain attraction. Some of the animals include Asian arowana, Bermuda blue angelfish, chocolate chip star, clownfish, common carp, emperor angelfish, gold-spotted spinefoot, honeycomb moray, long-spine porcupinefish, orangespine, unicornfish, orbicular batfish, pangas catfish, queen coris , red-bellied pacu, red-bellied piranha, Red Sea sailfin tang, redtail catfish, redtoothed triggerfish, reef stonefish, Siberian sturgeon, small-spotted catshark, snowflake moray, spotted sailfin suckermouth catfish, spotted unicornfish, tambaqui, Vlamingii tang, white-spotted puffer and zebra moray.

Twilight Cave
The Twilight Cave is a walkthrough exhibit containing free-flying Rodrigues fruit bats and Seba's leaf-nosed bats. Nocturnal exhibits within this area are home to night monkeys.

African Villages

Goat Walk
The African Village is an interactive walkthrough area allowing visitors to see African village wildlife and a replica African village home. The Goat Walk contains a walkthrough area containing Cameroon sheep, pygmy goats and Somali sheep.

Meet the Meerkats
This exhibit is home to a large mob of meerkats.

Walking with Lemurs
This is the largest walkthrough lemur wood in the UK, with three lemur species: ring-tailed, white-fronted brown and red-bellied.

Hippo Lakes
A large number of lakes may be found in the amusement area. One of these has become home to the largest pod of hippos in the UK.

Ostriches
Further up the bank from the Goat Walk there is a group of ostriches. Addax were formerly held here.

References

External links

 

Safari parks
Amusement parks in England
Zoos in England
Tourist attractions in Worcestershire
Buildings and structures in Worcestershire
1973 establishments in England
Zoos established in 1973
Bewdley